Abyla  was the pre-Roman name of Ad Septem Fratres (actual Ceuta of Spain). Ad Septem Fratres, usually shortened to Septem or Septa, was a Roman colony in the province of Mauretania Tingitana and a Byzantine outpost in the exarchate of Africa. Its ruins are located within present-day Ceuta, an autonomous Spanish city in northwest Africa.

Names
The name Abyla is said to have been a Punic name ("Lofty Mountain" or "Mountain of God") for Jebel Musa, the southern Pillar of Hercules. It appears in Greek variously as Abýla, Abýlē,  Ablýx, and Abílē Stḗlē ("Pillar of Abyla") and in Latin as Mount Abyla or the Pillar of Abyla.

The settlement below Jebel Musa was later renamed for the seven hills around the site, collectively referred to as the "Seven Brothers" (Heptádelphoi). In particular, the Roman stronghold at the site took the name "Fort at the Seven Brothers". This was gradually shortened to Septem (Sépton) or, occasionally, Septa. It continued as Sebtan or Sabta during the Middle Ages.

History

Punic

The Phoenicians found a small Berber settlement on the Strait of Gibraltar at Ceuta but, because the extremely narrow isthmus joining the Peninsula of Almina to the African mainland makes the site imminently defensible, they swiftly made it their own. Abyla was one of a number of settlements in the areaincluding Tinga (Tangiers), Kart (San Roque), and Gadir (Cadiz)that helped the Phoenicians and Carthaginians control maritime trade between the Atlantic and the Mediterranean.

Mauretanian
After the fall of Carthage in the Punic Wars, most of northwest Africa was left to the Roman client states of Numidia and Mauretania but Punic culture continued to thrive in Septem, whose residents mostly continued to speak Punic into the reign of Augustus.

Roman

Rome began exerting increasing control over the region, though, first through traders and advisors and thenparticularly after Thapsusthrough the incorporation of more and more towns and regions into directly administered provinces. Roman settlement at Septem began under Augustus. Caligula assassinated the Mauretanian king Ptolemy in AD40 and seized his kingdom. Claudius organized the new territories in 42, placing Septem in the province of Mauretania Tingitana (administered from Tingis, present-day Tangiers) and raising it to the level of a colony, which gave Roman citizenship to its residents. Wealthy Romans from Claudius's and Nero's reigns are attested in funerary inscriptions found around the Septem basilica.

Controlling commercial and military access to the Gibraltar Strait, Septem flourished under the empire. Around AD100, under Trajan, a local senate was made organized from the local nobles. The town was particularly known for its salt and salted fish, which expanded greatly after about AD140 as new production centers opened up around the town forum. The salt, salted fish, and salted produce were exportedmainly across the strait to Roman Spainin jars manufactured around the city. Roman roads also connected it over land with Tingis and Volubilis, increasing inland trade and security from Berber raiding. By the 2nd century, romanization was nearly complete and Latin appears in most surviving inscriptions. Alongside the Roman colonists, however, there remained a sizable community of romanized Berbers whose primary tongue continued to be local dialects mixed with Punic and Latin loanwords; this eventually became African Romance.

Around AD200, the African emperor Septimus Severus included the town in some of the largesse with which he favored the region. The town's prosperity continued into the late 3rd century, after which production centers were abandoned and the use of money falls off.

Septem was an important Christian center by the 4th century; one of the basilicas from this time has recently been rediscovered.) In the late 4th century, under , the city still had 10,000 inhabitants, nearly all Christian and Latin-speaking.

Vandal
Septem fell to the Vandals in 426.

Byzantine
By the time of Belisarius's reconquest of North Africa, the Vandals had already lost Septem to local Berber revolts. The Byzantines retook the entire coastline, then established their "Commander of Mauretania" at the more defensible Septem instead of the old capital at Tingis. Mauretania and the Byzantine holdings in Andalusia were nominally part of the Exarchate of Africa but so distant that it is likely the garrison at Septem was forced to do homage to Visigothic Spain.

Muslim
There are no reliable contemporary histories concerning the end of the Islamic conquest of the Maghreb around the year 710. Instead, the rapid Muslim conquest of Spain produced romances concerning Count Julian of Septem and his betrayal of Christendom in revenge for the dishonors that befell his daughter at the Visigothic court of KingRoderick. Allegedly with Julian's encouragement and instructions, the Berber convert and freedman Tariq ibn Ziyad took his garrison from Tangiers across the strait and overran the Spanish so swiftly that both he and his Persian master Musa bin Nusayr fell afoul of a jealous caliph, who stripped them of their wealth and titles.

After the death of Julian, sometimes also described as a king of the Ghomara Berbers, Berber converts to Islam took direct control of Septa. It was then destroyed during their great revolt against the Caliphate around 740.

Septa subsequently remained a small village of Muslims and Christians surrounded by ruins until its resettlement in the 9th century by Mâjakas, chief of the Majkasa Berber tribe, who started the short-lived Banu Isam dynasty. The continuing existence of an embattled Christian community is attested by the martyrdom of St.Daniel Fasanella and his Franciscans in 1227; it subsequently survived until the town's capture by the Portuguese reëstablished the Roman Catholic Diocese of Ceuta on 4 April 1417. The Ceuta Cathedral was then raised on the site of old Septem's 6th-century church.

See also
 Ceuta
 Tingis & Mauretania Tingitana
 Tamuda
 Rusadir

References

Citations

Bibliography
 .
 .
 Conant, Jonathan. Staying Roman : conquest and identity in Africa and the Mediterranean (pp. 439–700). Cambridge New York: Cambridge University Press. . Cambridge, 2012
 Cravioto, Enrique. La circulación monetaria alto-imperial en el norte de la Mauretania Tingitana. Universidad de Castilla-La Mancha. Cuenca, 2007.
 .
 Mommsen, Theodore. The Provinces of the Roman Empire, Section Africa. Ed Barnes & Noble. New York, 2005
 Noé Villaverde, Vega. Tingitana en la antigüedad tardía, siglos III-VII: autoctonía y romanidad en el extremo occidente mediterráneo. Ed. Real Academia de la Historia. Madrid, 2001 
 Robin, Daniel. Faith, Hope and love in the early churches of North Africa (This Holy Seed). Tamarisk Publications, Chester, United Kingdom 
 .
 .
 Talbi, Mohammed. Le Christianisme maghrébinin "Indigenous Christian Communities in Islamic Lands". M. Gervers and R. Bikhazi. Toronto, 1990.

Mauretania Tingitana
Roman towns and cities in Spain
Phoenician colonies in Spain
History of Ceuta
Roman towns and cities in Mauretania Tingitana